The Green Party of Ohio is the state party organization for Ohio of the Green Party of the United States.

History
The Green Party of Ohio was founded as the Green Party of Northeast Ohio (the Northeast Ohio Greens) in the early 1990s. The Green Party of Northeast Ohio was a recognized local of the Greens/Green Party USA (GPUSA), the only national Green organization at the time.

In the mid-1990s, and leading up to the 1996 US presidential election and Ralph Nader's minimalist candidacy, the Greens in Ohio were caught up in the strategic debate that found its expression at the national level in the competing GPUSA/Association of State Green Parties (ASGP) tendencies. Some Ohio Greens were decidedly non-electoral and did not support the ASGP effort for a Nader candidacy. The Green Party of Ohio's effort to put Nader on the ballot in 1996 fell about 315 signatures short.

In January 2000, Paul Dumouchelle convened a meeting of 11 prominent Ohio Greens and formed the committee that got Nader on the ballot in Ohio that year. Ohio sent four delegates to the Denver Convention that nominated Nader:  David Ellison, Daryl Davis, and two others. Ohio had an active statewide Nader campaign and electoral results were similar to the national level. Logan Martinez ran for a State Representative seat in Dayton that year, as well.

In 2014, the party retained its place as a ballot-qualified party thanks to Anita Rios's campaign for Governor.

In April 2016, Cleveland City Councilman Brian Cummins switched from the Green Party to the Democratic Party.

The party helped its presidential candidate Dr. Jill Stein fundraise for recounts in three states.

In June 2021, the Ohio Green Party announced the revival of their Youth caucus, the Young Eco-Socialists. A month later, they began reviving more state-wide caucuses. In July 2021, the Labor Caucus of the Ohio Green Party was formed, the first of its kind for a state party in the Green Party of the United States, focuses solely on labor organizing and supporting the labor movement. Since July 2021, the Black Caucus, Women's Caucus, Energy (Anti-Nuclear) Caucus, and Lavender (LGBTQIA) Caucus have been launched.

During the 2021 local elections, the Ohio Green Party ran K.A. Heard Jr. and Logan Simmering for City Council in Cincinnati. They also ran James Kushlan for Toledo City Council at-large.

Electoral Performance

References

External links
Current Memberships for Joe Manchik | $250.00 maximum campaign donation per registered voter no corporate donations authorized National Green Party bylaws
Green Party of Ohio
Green Party Joe Manchick for Ohio's 12th congressional district of Ohio

O
Political parties in Ohio
State and local socialist parties in the United States